Saw Pale was the mother of King Mohnyin Thado of Ava. She was a great-granddaughter of King Kyawswa I of Pinya from her father's side. Her descendants became kings of Ava down to 1527. She was also a nine-times great-grandmother of King Alaungpaya of the Konbaung dynasty.

References

Bibliography
 
 
 

Ava dynasty